Edward Black (May 30, 1853 – June 30, 1872) is considered the youngest serving soldier of the American Civil War. He had a twin brother, Edwin, who died in 1854.

Early life

U.S. military service
Edward Black was recruited at the age of eight, on July 24, 1861, as a drummer boy for the 21st Indiana Infantry. He was told to return home later that year and did as told. He returned later that year and enlisted again, but this time with his father. He was captured at the Battle of Baton Rouge, but was freed when the city fell and discharged in September 1862. He re-enlisted in February 1863, and served with the 1st Indiana Heavy Artillery until January 1866. He died at age 19 in 1872 and was interred along with his twin brother Edwin  in Crown Hill National Cemetery in Indianapolis. The drum Black used is now in the collection of the Children's Museum of Indianapolis.

Death

He died from the injuries and trauma he suffered in the war at age 19. He was buried along with his brother William Black.

See also
William Black

External links
 

1853 births
1872 deaths
Burials at Crown Hill Cemetery
Union Army soldiers
Child soldiers in the American Civil War